Bagshaw Hall is a 17th-century grade II* listed country hall on Bagshaw Hill in Bakewell, Derbyshire.

History 
The hall was constructed by Thomas Bagshaw (1638–1721), a solicitor. Thomas was the son of Thomas Bagshawe of The Ridge in Chapel-en-le-Frith.

See also
Grade II* listed buildings in Derbyshire Dales
Listed buildings in Bakewell

References 

Houses completed in 1684
Grade II* listed buildings in Derbyshire
Country houses in Derbyshire
Bakewell